The best known vertex transitive digraphs (as of October 2008) in the directed Degree diameter problem are tabulated below.

Table of the orders of the largest known vertex-symmetric graphs for the directed degree diameter problem

Key to colors

References

External links
 Vertex-symmetric Digraphs online table.
  The Degree - Diameter Problem on CombinatoricsWiki.org.
 Eyal Loz's Degree-Diameter problem page.

Directed graphs